Bursa Atatürk Sport Hall is a multi-purpose indoor sport venue located in the district of Altıparmak, Osmangazi in Bursa, Turkey. The hall, with a capacity for 3,000 people, was built in 1972.

Home of four clubs Bursaspor Basketbol, Oyak Renault Basketball, Yeşim SK and Uludağ Üniversitesi SK, it is the biggest indoor sport hall in Bursa, where competitions of basketball, volleyball and handball are held.

Bursa Atatürk Sport Hall hosted 15 games of the Group A in the preliminary round of the Eurobasket 2005 Women between September 2 and 7 2005.

References
 Bursa Atatürk Sport Hall 

Atatürk Sport Hall
Indoor arenas in Turkey
Basketball venues in Turkey
Turkish Basketball League venues
Sports venues completed in 1972
Buildings and structures in Bursa
1972 establishments in Turkey
Things named after Mustafa Kemal Atatürk